Marco Ruzittu (born 15 June 1991) is an Italian football player. He plays for Arzachena.

Club career
He made his Serie C debut for Arzachena on 27 August 2017 in a game against Arezzo.

References

External links

 

1991 births
People from the Province of Sassari
Living people
Italian footballers
Cagliari Calcio players
Casale F.B.C. players
Arzachena Academy Costa Smeralda players
Serie C players
Serie D players
Association football goalkeepers
Footballers from Sardinia